James Salvator John Novelli (October 18, 1885 - May 31, 1940) was an Italian American sculptor known for his funeral and war memorials.

Biography
Novelli was born in 1885 in Sulmona, a province of Aquila, Italy. His family settled in lower Manhattan in New York and he was raised in a tenement house on Mulberry Street in the Five Points, which became the heart of Little Italy.

In 1903, Novelli returned to Italy to study and graduated from the Royal Academy of Fine Arts in Rome in 1908. As student he earned an honorable mention for his work submitted to the 1906 International Exposition in Paris. He participated in the New York competition about "conceptions of war" in 1915.

He later lived in Chelsea in Manhattan and received numerous commissions. After marrying he lived in Queens, New York, with his wife, Lillian, and son.

His career foundering during the Depression, he worked city's monument crew. He committed suicide in 1940.

Works

America Triumphant (1922), Pershing Field, Jersey City Heights, Jersey City
Clayton Point World War I Monument (1928) Clason Point, Bronx
Memorial door DeSalvio mausoleum (1938), Calvary Cemetery, Queens
Memorial door LaGioia mausoleum (1923), Calvary Cemetery, Queens
Memorial door Latorraca mausoleum (1938), Calvary Cemetery, Queens
Rockingham War Memorial (1927-1928), Bellows Falls, Vermont
Saratoga Monument (1920) Saratoga Park, Bedford–Stuyvesant, Brooklyn
The Spirit of Flight (1928), Fort Wayne, Indiana
Victory Memorial Fountain (1929), William F. Moore Park, Corona, Queens (fountain removed, tablet remains)
Winfield War Memorial and Victorious America. (1926) Winfield Plaza, Woodside, Queens
Woodlawn Cemetery (Bronx, New York), memorials

References

External links
Testimony by Novelli

1885 births
1940 deaths
People from Sulmona
20th-century American sculptors
Sculptors from New York (state)
American male sculptors
Sculptors who committed suicide
20th-century American male artists
American people of Italian descent
Italian emigrants to the United States